The 612th Tactical Fighter Squadron is an inactive United States Air Force unit.  It was last assigned to the 401st Tactical Fighter Wing at Torrejon Air Base, Spain, where it was inactivated on 1 October 1991.

The squadron was first activated during World War II as the 612th Bombardment Squadron.  After training in the United States it moved to England, where it participated in the strategic bombing campaign against Germany.  It earned two Distinguished Unit Citations for combat action.  Following V-E Day, the squadron was inactivated in England.  It was briefly active in the reserves from 1947, becoming a corollary unit in 1949.  In the spring of 1951, it was mobilized for the Korean War and its personnel were used to fill out other units before the squadron was inactivated

The squadron was redesignated the 612th Fighter-Bomber Squadron and activated in 1954 at Alexandria Air Force Base, Louisiana.  In 1965 in moved to Japan, but most of the squadron was assigned to a detachment located in Vietnam.  In 1971 it formally moved to Vietnam for a few months before it moved to Torrejon Air Base, Spain, where it continued fighter operations until inactivating in 1991.

History

World War II

Organization and training for combat
The 612th Bombardment Squadron was activated March 1943 at Ephrata Army Air Base Washington as one of the original squadrons of the 401st Bombardment Group.  The initial cadre for the squadron was drawn from the 395th Bombardment Group at Ephrata and the 383d Bombardment Group at Rapid City Army Air Field, South Dakota.  The cadre soon departed for Orlando Army Air Base, Florida, where they conducted simulated combat missions with the Army Air Forces School of Applied Tactics out of Brooksville Army Air Field.

The ground echelon moved to Geiger Field, Washington in May 1943 and to Great Falls Army Air Base, Mount in July.  At Great Falls the first combat crews were assigned to the squadron.  In the final stage of training the squadrons dispersed with the 612th remaining at Great Falls, while the other squadrons trained at bases in Montana and Wyoming.

After completing training the ground echelon left for overseas on 19 October 1943. The air echelon staged for deployment at Scott Field, Illinois then flew to England under the control of Air Transport Command via Newfoundland, Iceland and Scotland.

Combat in the European Theater of Operations
On arrival in England, half of the 401st group's aircrews were immediately reassigned to the 351st Bombardment Group.  The rest of the squadron became part of Eighth Air Force at RAF Deenethorpe. The 612th became part of the 92d Combat Bombardment Wing of the 1st Bombardment Division. Its tail code was Triangle-S.

On 26 November the 612th flew its first combat mission against Bremen, Germany.  The 401st group did not suffer the combat loss of an airplane until its ninth mission on 30 December.   The squadron operated chiefly against strategic targets, bombing industries, submarine facilities, shipyards, missile sites, marshalling yards, and airfields.  On 11 January 1944 the squadron was in the lead group of the 1st Bombardment Division in an attack against aircraft manufacturing facilities at Oschersleben, Germany.  Although the bombers were able to attack, poor weather conditions prevented the division from receiving effective fighter cover.  For over three hours the bomber formation suffered more than 400 attacks by Luftwaffe fighters, including air-to-air rocket attacks.  Despite these attacks the unit continued its attack and struck a telling blow against German aircraft production for which the squadron was awarded the Distinguished Unit Citation (DUC).

A little over a month later, on 20 February, the squadron earned its second DUC for an attack on the Erla Maschinenwerke aircraft manufacturing facilities in Leipzig, Germany.  Despite fighter attacks and battle damage to the 612th's planes, 100% of the unit's bombs fell within 1000 feet of the aiming point.  Beginning in October 1944, the unit concentrated its attacks on Axis oil reserves.

In addition to strategic missions, squadron operations included attacks on transportation, airfields, and fortifications prior to the Normandy invasion.  On D-Day the 612th attacked Normandy beachhead areas dropping bombs five minutes before troops landed.   The following month it provided close air support for the breakthrough at Saint-Lô, it also supported the siege of Brest in August and Operation Market Garden in September.  During the Battle of the Bulge in December 1944 and January 1945, the unit attacked transportation and communications in the battle area.  It supported airborne forces involved in Operation Varsity in March 1945.

The squadron flew its last combat mission on 20 April 1945 against Brandenberg. It had flown 254 combat missions from Deenethorpe airfield.   After V-E Day, the squadron flew missions to Linz, Austria to evacuate British and French prisoners of war.  It also flew "Trolley" sightseeing missions at low level, flying ground support personnel over the Ruhr and Frankfurt am Main to see the damage that had been done as a result of their efforts.

The unit was alerted for redeployment to the Pacific Theater and the last plane departed Deenethorpe in early June. Upon arrival in the US, personnel were granted thirty days leave, reassembling at Sioux Falls Army Air Field, South Dakota, but plans had changed and personnel were either transferred to Boeing B-29 Superfortress units or processed for discharge and the squadron was inactivated.

Reserve operations
The squadron was activated at Brooks Field (later Brooks Air Force Base), Texas in June 1947 as a unit of the reserves.  It trained under the supervision of the 178th AAF Base Unit (later 2593d Air Force Reserve Training Center) of Air Defense Command (ADC).  It is not clear whether or not the squadron was fully staffed or equipped.  In 1948, Continental Air Command assumed responsibility for managing reserve and Air National Guard units from ADC.  President Truman’s reduced 1949 defense budget required reductions in the number of units in the Air Force. As a result, in June 1949, the 612th moved to Biggs Air Force Base and became a corollary unit of Strategic Air Command's 97th Bombardment Wing, which was stationed there.  The May 1949 Air Force Reserve program had called for this new type of unit, which was a reserve unit integrated with an active duty unit.  The plan was viewed as the best method to train reservists by mixing them with an existing regular unit to perform duties alongside the regular unit.

All reserve corollary units were mobilized for the Korean war.  The 612th was called up on 1 May 1951.  Its personnel were used as fillers for other organizations and it was inactivated on 25 June.

Fighter operations

The squadron was redesignated the 612th Fighter-Bomber Squadron and activated at Alexandria Air Force Base, Louisiana in February 1954.  Initially equipped with North American F-86 Sabres, then with Republic F-84F Thunderstreaks, by 1957 the squadron was flying North American F-100 Super Sabres as the 612th Tactical Fighter Squadron.  The squadron participated in firepower demonstrations military exercises and maneuvers,  It deployed aircraft and personnel to Europe and the Middle East to support NATO.  During the Cuban Missile Crisis, the squadron operated from Homestead Air Force Base, Florida.  By 1965, however, deployments had begun to the Pacific and Southeast Asia.

The squadron moved to Misawa Air Base, Japan in November 1965, where it was assigned to the 39th Air Division.  From Misawa, the squadron deployed aircraft and crews to Detachment 2 of the 39th Division, located at Kunsan Air Base, South Korea.  In 1966, the squadron deployed to Phan Rang Air Base, South Viet Nam.  On 10 October, Detachment 1 of the squadron was formed at Phan Rang, where it came under the operational control of the 35th Tactical Fighter Wing.  Although the squadron continued to exist as a paper unit at Misawa, all of its resources were assigned to the detachment, which engaged in combat operations in Vietnam.  Between June 1967 and April 1969, the detachment operatied from Phu Cat Air Base under the control of the 37th Tactical Fighter Wing, before returning to Phan Rang.

In January 1968, the 39th Air Division was inactivated and the 475th Tactical Fighter Wing moved to Misawa.  The squadron was reassigned, but remained a paper unit until March 1971, when it moved without personnel and equipment and replaced Detachment 1 at Phan Rang.  The American presence in Vietnam was being reduced, however, and the squadron's time at Phan Rang was limited.  Combat operations ceased in late June, and on 15 July the squadron moved without personnel and equipment for the second time.

The squadron moved on paper to rejoin the 401st Wing at Torrejon Air Base, Spain in July 1971, replacing the 308th Tactical Fighter Squadron and assuming its personnel and  McDonnell F-4 Phantom IIs.  The squadron deployed to advanced locations in Europe and the Middle East, where it stood alert status.  In 1983, the squadron converted to the General Dynamics F-16 Fighting Falcon. 
It deployed its forces to Incirlik Air Base, Turkey in 1990, where they formed the 612th Tactical Fighter Squadron (Provisional) under the 7440th Composite Wing (Provisional).  After return to Torrejon the squadron was inactivated in the fall of 1991 as the United States removed its combat units permanently stationed in Spain.

Lineage
 Constituted as the 612th Bombardment Squadron (Heavy) on 20 March 1943
 Activated on 1 April 1943
 Redesignated 612th Bombardment Squadron, Heavy ca. 1 November 1943
 Inactivated on 28 August 1945
 Redesignated 612th Bombardment Squadron, Very Heavy on 27 May 1947
 Activated in the reserve on 26 June 1947
 Redesignated 612th Bombardment Squadron, Medium on 27 June 1949
 Ordered to active service on 1 May 1951
 Inactivated on 25 June 1951
 Redesignated 612th Fighter-Bomber Squadron on 24 November 1953
 Activated on 8 February 1954
 Redesignated 612th Tactical Fighter Squadron on 1 July 1958
 Inactivated on 1 October 1991

Assignments
 401st Bombardment Group, 1 April 1943 – 28 August 1945
 401st Bombardment Group, 26 June 1947 – 25 June 1951
 401st Fighter-Bomber Group, 8 February 1954
 401st Fighter-Bomber Wing (later Tactical Fighter Wing), 25 September 1957
 39th Air Division, 3 November 1965
 475th Tactical Fighter Wing, 15 January 1968
 35th Tactical Fighter Wing, 15 March 1971
 401st Tactical Fighter Wing, 15 July 1971 – 1 October 1991

Stations

 Ephrata Army Air Base, Washington, 1 April 1943
 Geiger Field, Washington, 4 June 1943
 Great Falls Army Air Base, Montana, 8 July 1943 – 19 October 1943
 RAF Deenethorpe (AAF-128), England, 4 November 1943 – 20 June 1945
 Sioux Falls Army Air Field, South Dakota, c. 1 August 1945 – 28 August 1945
 Brooks Field (later Brooks Air Force Base), Texas, 26 June 1947

 Biggs Air Force Base, Texas, 27 June 1949 – 25 June 1951
 Alexandria Air Force Base (later England Air Force Base), Louisiana, 8 February 1954
 Misawa Air Base, Japan, 3 November 1965
 Phan Rang Air Base, Republic of Vietnam, 15 March 1971
 Torrejon Air Base, Spain, 5 July 1971 - 1 October 1991

Aircraft
 Boeing B-17 Flying Fortress, 1943–1945
 North American F-86 Sabre, 1954–1955
 Republic F-84 Thunderjet, 1954–1957
 North American F-100 Super Sabre, 1957–1971
 McDonnell Douglas F-4 Phantom II, 1971–1983
 General Dynamics F-16 Fighting Falcon, 1983–1991

Awards and Campaigns

See also

 List of United States Air Force fighter squadrons
 General Dynamics F-16 Fighting Falcon operators
 List of F-4 Phantom II operators
 List of F-100 units of the United States Air Force 
 List of F-86 Sabre units
 List of B-29 Superfortress operators
 B-17 Flying Fortress units of the United States Army Air Forces

References

Notes
 Explanatory notes

 Citations

Bibliography

 
 
 
 
 
 
 
 
  
 

Fighter squadrons of the United States Air Force
Military units and formations of the United States in the Cold War